Omni Hotels & Resorts is an American privately held, international luxury hotel company based in Dallas, Texas. The company was founded in 1958 as Dunfey Hotels, and operates 50 properties in the United States, Canada, and Mexico, totaling over 20,010 rooms and employing more than 23,000 people.

History 
Dunfey Hotels was founded in 1958, when the Dunfey brothers added a 32-room motel to their Lamie's Tavern restaurant property in Hampton, New Hampshire. They soon established a hotel chain throughout New England, including 14 Sheraton Hotels franchises
 in 1964. In 1968, the Dunfeys acquired the near-bankrupt Parker House Hotel in Boston. In 1971, the brothers sold Dunfey Hotels to the Hartford-based Aetna Life Insurance Company, which retained the brothers to manage the properties. In 1976, Aer Lingus, the national airline of Ireland, purchased Dunfey Hotels from Aetna.

In 1983, Dunfey Hotels acquired the small Atlanta-based Omni International Hotels chain from Cousins Properties. The chain had been formed in 1973 and consisted of three hotels in Atlanta, Norfolk and Miami. Dunfey Hotels was reorganized into two operating divisions, with Omni Hotels focusing on large, upscale modern hotels, while the remaining smaller motels and Sheraton franchises were branded as Dunfey Hotels while they were divested over the following three years.

In 1988, Aer Lingus sold Omni Hotels to World International Holdings, Ltd., and the Hong Kong–based conglomerate The Wharf (Holdings) Limited for $135 million. Those companies, in turn, sold Omni in February 1996 to Texas-based private equity investor Robert Rowling of TRT Holdings, who moved the chain's headquarters for the very first time, from Hampton to his own base of Corpus Christi, Texas. The following year, Omni's headquarters moved again, to Dallas.

In 2000, Omni Hotels struck a deal with Turner Broadcasting to build a 600-room tower wing addition next to their existing hotel located in the CNN Center. The new wing opened in 2003. Omni bought Time Warner's share of the building in 2017.

In 2010, Omni Hotels purchased the Omni Amelia Island Resort in Florida for $67.1 million.

In January 2013, Omni Hotels acquired ClubCorp's Montelucia Resort & Spa. In June 2013, Omni Hotels acquired 5 properties (Barton Creek Resort & Spa in Austin, TX - La Costa Resort and Spa in Carlsbad, CA - Rancho Las Palmas Resort & Spa in Rancho Mirage, CA - The Grove Park Inn in Asheville, NC - The Homestead in Hot Springs, VA) from KSL Capital Partners. With this deal - worth $900 million according to The Wall Street Journal - Omni Hotels became an owner and operator of iconic American golf resorts. In July 2013, Omni Hotels assumed management and operations of the King Edward Hotel in Toronto, and bought shares of the property. In December 2015, Omni Hotels acquired the Omni Mount Washington Resort from CNL Financial Group, which it had operated under its brand since 2009.

In March 2018, Peter Strebel was named President of Omni Hotels & Resorts.

In December 2020, unions criticized Omni for using the Paycheck Protection Program to obtain a low-interest loan for business purposes, rather than using the money to pay workers (which would have turned the loan into a grant).

In March 2021, Omni sold five aging properties - Omni Dallas Hotel at Park West, Omni Houston Hotel at Westside, Omni San Antonio Hotel at the Colonnade, Omni Jacksonville Hotel and Omni Austin Hotel at Southpark.

Properties

All hotels managed and/or owned by Omni Corporate. The company had one franchised property, in Cancun, from 1988-2022.

United States

International

See also 

 TRT Holdings
 Robert Rowling
 List of chained-brand hotels

References

External links

Hotel chains in the United States
Companies based in Dallas
Hotels established in 1958
Hospitality companies of the United States
1958 establishments in Texas